The 1979 Segunda División de Chile was the 28th season of the Segunda División de Chile.

Deportes Iquique was the tournament's champion.

Table

See also
Chilean football league system

References

External links
 RSSSF 1979

Segunda División de Chile (1952–1995) seasons
Primera B
Chil